Sir Arthur Lewis Dixon, CB, CBE (30 January 1881 – 14 September 1969) was a British civil servant. He spent his entire career at the Home Office, where he reformed and modernized both the police and fire services. In particular, he was responsible for the creation of the National Fire Service during the Second World War.

References

External links 

 

Knights Bachelor
1969 deaths
Civil servants in the Home Office
Companions of the Order of the Bath
Commanders of the Order of the British Empire
People educated at Kingswood School, Bath
Alumni of Sidney Sussex College, Cambridge
British Methodists